Skerdi Bejzade (born 30 November 1974) is an Albanian football player, who has played for KF Partizani, KS Elbasani and KS Vllaznia in the Albanian Superliga. On 17 October 2009 he became player-manager at KF Partizani. On 3 December 2010 he became the manager of Albanian First Division club KS Kamza.

Managerial career
On 3 December 2010, Bejzade became the manager of Albanian First Division side KS Kamza. He left as manager of the club on 10 June 2011 ahead of their first-ever season in the Albanian Superliga, as his children were to begin their education in Germany.

In June 2012, he was named technical director of Elbasani.

References

1974 births
Living people
Footballers from Elbasan
Albanian footballers
Association football forwards
FK Dinamo Tirana players
SV Arminia Hannover players
KF Vllaznia Shkodër players
FK Partizani Tirana players
KF Elbasani players
Albanian expatriate footballers
Expatriate footballers in Germany
Albanian expatriate sportspeople in Germany
Albanian football managers
FK Partizani Tirana managers
FC Kamza managers